Emilio J. Pasarell (1891–1974) was a Puerto Rican short story writer, novelist, essayist and historian.

Origin
Pasarell was born in Ponce, Puerto Rico in 1891, the son of Manuel Pasarell-Mila de la Rosa (also known as Manuel Pasarell y Mila de la Rosa).

Works
Some of Pasarell's writings include:
 Notes of the Inauguration of the San Juan (Puerto Rico) Municipal Theater - A careful documentation of the history of Teatro Tapia 
 Ripples on the Surface of Great Themes. 
 Orígenes y desarrollo de la afición teatral en Puerto Rico. San Juan, Puerto Rico: Editorial del Departmento de Instruccion Publica de Puerto Rico. 1970. 465 pages plus 78 laminated pages at the end of the text. - A detailed description of the life of Antonio Paoli.
 Esculcando el Siglo XIX en Puerto Rico. Barcelona, Spain: Editorial Rumbos. 1967. 132 pages.  
 Conjunto Literario. Barcelona, Spain: Editorial Rumbos. 1963. 168 pages.  
 De la Pluma al Papel. Barcelona, Spain: Editorial Rumbos. 1967. 282 pages.
 Ensayos y Articulos. San Juan, Puerto Rico: Editorial Cordillera. 1968. 217 pages.

Legacy
Emilio Pasarell is recognized, along with a handful of other Ponce historians, at Ponce's Park of Illustrious Ponce Citizens.

References

External links
Celebrating culture: Space, symbols, and tradition in Latin America and the Caribbean

See also

 List of Puerto Rican writers
List of Puerto Ricans
 Puerto Rican literature

1891 births
1974 deaths
20th-century Puerto Rican historians
Writers from Ponce
Historians of Puerto Rico